The 1914–15 RPI men's ice hockey season was the 12th season of play for the program.

Season
For the third consecutive season Rensselaer failed to win a single game.

Note: Rensselaer's athletic teams were unofficially known as 'Cherry and White' until 1921 when the Engineers moniker debuted for the men's basketball team.

Roster

Standings

Schedule and Results

|-
!colspan=12 style=";" | Regular Season

References

RPI Engineers men's ice hockey seasons
RPI
RPI
RPI
RPI